Alejandro Stock Silberman is a Uruguayan-Spanish artist. Silberman was born in Montevideo, Uruguay in 1965, of Jewish-Russian origin through his mother Lidia Silberman and of Jewish-Austrian origin on his father side. Since 1993 he has lived and worked in Madrid, Spain. Nowadays, he works as a doctor but from At an early age, he felt an artistic calling, entering his first workshop at the age of 5.  Since then, He has realized a number of artistic and painting studies with the master Nelson Ramos in the Centro de Estudios Artísticos as well as different courses, fellowships and workshops in Uruguay, USA and Spain. Presently, he works as a doctor and as an artist

Exhibitions 
Since 1985 he has participated in more than 150 exhibits in Uruguay, Spain, Germany, Chile, the United States, Hungary, China, et cetera.  In 2007 he was invited to participate as an Honorary Artist in the 16th Salón Nacional Renault de Paris, participating as part of the jury as well.

Prizes and distinctions 
He has received distinctions on more than 30 occasions in painting, sculpture, cinema and literature, including working as a fellow at a Complutense University of Madrid summer workshop dedicated to perfecting engraving technique with the master artist José Hernández.

His works can be found in both private and public collections in Spain, Uruguay, the United States, Israel, France, Chile, England, China, and elsewhere.

References

See also 
 alejandrostock.com

1965 births
Living people
Uruguayan artists
Uruguayan people of Austrian-Jewish descent
Uruguayan people of Russian-Jewish descent
Jewish painters